Hognestad may refer to:

Hans Peter Hognestad (1964–), Norwegian television producer
Helge Hognestad (1940–), Norwegian priest
Ivar Hognestad (1956–), Norwegian politician
Ivar Kristiansen Hognestad (1888–1973), Norwegian politician
Lars Hognestad (1968–), Norwegian television producer
Peter Hognestad (1866–1931), Norwegian bishop
Thoralf Hognestad (born 1962), Norwegian curler and coach
Tor Christian Hognestad (1943–), Norwegian visual artist